Disney's Old Key West Resort is a Disney Vacation Club resort located at the Walt Disney World Resort in Lake Buena Vista, Florida. It opened on December 20, 1991, and was formerly known as Disney's Vacation Club Resort until January 1996 when it was renamed. It was the first Disney Vacation Club Timeshare Resort and has the largest rooms of any of the fifteen Disney Vacation Club Resorts. The accommodations include kitchen facilities and a laundry room. The rooms are designed in a Key West theme. Rooms are also available year-round for rental by non-members (and members) as Disney Vacation Club retains ownership of a majority of the resort.

In October 2007, the resort received designation in the Florida Green Lodging Program.

Dining 
Olivia's Cafe is the only to-stay restaurant at Disney's Old Key West Resort and offers American style breakfast, lunch, and dinner menu.
 	
Good's Food to Go is a counter service restaurant located on the Turtle Krawl.

Gurgling Suitcase is the bar at Disney's Old Key West Resort.
 
Turtle Shack is a counter service location at the village pool on Old Turtle Pond Road.

Transportation 

Disney's Old Key West Resort is served by Disney Transport bus and watercraft transportation.

References

Further reading

External links 
 Disney's Old Key West Resort Disney Vacation Club Official site
 Disney's Old Key West Resort Walt Disney World Official Site
 Old Key West Resort Photo Gallery at HanBan Photos

Old Key West Resort
Hotels established in 1991
Hotel buildings completed in 1991
1991 establishments in Florida